Murchad Ua Flaithbertaig was Bishop of Annaghdown .

Ua Flaithbertaig was a member of that branch of the Muintir Murchada who took the surname Ó Flaithbheartaigh. His family were originally native to the Diocese of Annaghdown before been expelled by the Kings of Connacht and the de Burgh Earls of Ulster. Nothing particular appears to be known of Murchad's term, though he is credited with the construct (or restoration) of a round tower at Annaghdown in 1238, the last ever to be raised in Ireland.

See also
 Ó Flaithbertaigh

References

Sources
 A New History of Ireland: Volume IX - Maps, Genealogies, Lists, ed. T.W. Moody, F.X. Martin, F.J. Byrne, pp. 322–324.

External links
 http://www.ucc.ie/celt/published/T100005C/
 http://www.irishtimes.com/ancestor/surname/index.cfm?fuseaction=Go.&UserID=

People from County Galway
13th-century Roman Catholic bishops in Ireland
Bishops of Annaghdown
Medieval Gaels from Ireland